Phaedranassa is a genus of South American and Central American plants in Amaryllis family, subfamily Amaryllidoideae.

Species accepted as of (April 2015)

formerly included
Several names have been coined using the name Phaedranassa but referring to species now regarded as better suited in other genera (Eucrosia Rauhia Stenomesson).

References

 
Amaryllidaceae genera
Flora of South America
Taxonomy articles created by Polbot